Amor y Lágrimas (Eng.: Love and Tears) is the title of a studio album released by mexican-american performer Adán "Chalino" Sánchez. This album became his first number-one set on the Billboard Top Latin Albums and the first released after his death in 2004.

Track listing
The information from Billboard

Chart performance

References 

2004 albums
Adán Sánchez albums